This list contains the 59 buildings and structures officially designated as cultural monuments in Lučenec, Slovakia.

Sources 
 English translation of the Slovak Wikipedia

Buildings and structures in Banská Bystrica Region
Heritage registers in Slovakia